María Elvira Salazar (born November 1, 1961) is an American journalist, author, and politician serving as the U.S. representative for Florida's 27th congressional district. She is a Republican assistant whip. Before entering politics, Salazar worked for the Spanish-language network Telemundo for three decades after serving as a news anchor for Miami-based WSBS TV. She has also worked for CNN Español and Univision.

Salazar was the Republican nominee for Congress in 2018, losing to Donna Shalala. She won the 2020 rematch with 51.4% of the vote to Shalala's 48.6%. Salazar's term in office began on January 3, 2021, and she was scheduled to be sworn in to the 117th United States Congress that day, but was diagnosed with COVID-19 shortly before the start of the term, and was sworn in on January 12 instead.

Early life and education
Salazar was born in Miami's Little Havana neighborhood, the daughter of Cuban exiles. She grew up bilingual, speaking both Spanish and English. She spent part of her childhood in Puerto Rico.

Salazar studied at the Deerborne School of Coral Gables and graduated from Miami Dade College. In 1983, she earned a Bachelor of Arts in communications from the University of Miami, and in 1995, she earned a Master of Public Administration from Harvard Kennedy School at Harvard University.

Journalism
Salazar's journalism career began in 1983 as a general assignment reporter for Channel 23. In 1984, she served as senior political correspondent for the National News in Spanish television in the U.S. for the Spanish International Network, which later became Univision. In 1988, she began working as a White House and Pentagon correspondent for Univision. In 1991, she became the bureau chief at the Central America division of Univision while covering the war in El Salvador.

In 1993, Salazar started working for the Telemundo Network, serving later as senior political correspondent for Telemundo in Cuba. In 1995, she interviewed Fidel Castro for Telemundo at the Cuban mission to the UN. She is said to have been the only U.S. Spanish-language television journalist to interview Castro one-on-one.

In 1996, she was one of the two Hispanic journalists to participate in the only political debate in the 50 years after the Cuban revolution between two politically active figures: Ricardo Alarcon, the president of the National Cuban Assembly, and Jorge Mas Canosa, the founder and president of the Cuban American National Foundation and one of the most famous supporters of the anti-Castro movement.

Salazar worked at Telemundo until 2002, when she continued her career as a journalist with America TV 41 with her own political news show, Maria Elvira Confronta. In 2003, she moved to Channel 22.

In 2006, Raul Alarcon, owner of Spanish Broadcasting System (SBS), purchased channel 22, and the channel is now known as Mega TV. Salazar changed the name of her program to Polo Opuestos under the new owners. She maintained the debate dynamic of her show, but renamed it Maria Elvira Live!.

She interviewed several actors of the telenovela Pablo Escobar: The Drug Lord, including the imprisoned Escobar lieutenant John Jairo Velásquez.

Salazar has said that after her interview with Castro, her second-biggest TV interview was with the former Chilean president Augusto Pinochet in 2003. Chilean Judge Juan Guzman cited the interview as a legal basis to rule Pinochet "mentally competent to stand trial for human rights violations".

On 2013, Salazar interviewed Cuban dissident and blogger Yoani Sánchez in New York City.

Salazar has interviewed several public figures, including Presidents Bill Clinton (1999) and George W. Bush (2001), Mexican Presidents Vicente Fox and Carlos Salinas de Gortari (2005), Spanish President José María Aznar (2007), Colombian Presidents Alvaro Uribe (2008) and Juan Manuel Santos (2014), and Mother Teresa.

She has frequently appeared as a guest on Fox News television programs such as Fox & Friends, The O'Reilly Factor, Tucker Carlson Tonight, Hannity and The Ingraham Angle, as well as Mornings with Maria on the Fox Business Network and on the conservative network Newsmax, sometimes stylized under the name Elvira Salazar. Among her topics of discussion are immigration, border security and the fight against socialism.

In 2016, Salazar returned to Mega TV as the anchor of the night newscast.

U.S. House of Representatives

Elections

2018 

The Miami Herald reported in January 2018 that retiring Congresswoman Ileana Ros-Lehtinen, a Republican who had represented the 27th congressional district since 1989, had met with Salazar. Ros-Lehtinen said that her district was "totally winnable for the right candidate" from the Republican Party, adding that Salazar "could be the right candidate."

In March 2018, Salazar announced her candidacy to represent the district, which includes Miami Beach, most of Miami, Kendall, and parts of coastal south Dade County. The traditionally Republican district, which includes wealthy communities like Miami Beach, Key Biscayne and Coral Gables as well as Little Havana in Miami, had been trending Democratic in recent years.

Salazar's Republican primary opponent, Dade County Commissioner Bruno Barreiro, criticized her for her 1995 interview with Fidel Castro, in which she called Castro a "comandante", as well as a 2016 appearance on Fox News where she called Barack Obama's rapprochement with Cuba "noble". Salazar called Barreiro's attack advertising "defamatory", saying, "I have been one of the staunchest, most hardest critics of the Cuban Revolution on the air."

On August 28, 2018, Salazar won the Republican primary by a margin of about 15 points over Barreiro, her leading rival. Former Clinton cabinet member Donna Shalala won the Democratic nomination for the seat. The only debates held during the general election campaign were in Spanish. Shalala does not speak Spanish and used an interpreter, giving Salazar an advantage. Each candidate declined opportunities to debate the other in English due to scheduling conflicts. Although Hillary Clinton had won the district by almost 20 points in 2016 – Clinton's best showing in a Republican-held district – polling as late as a month before Election Day showed Salazar either narrowly ahead or statistically tied with Shalala. Salazar lost to Shalala, who received about 52% of the vote.

2020 

In August 2019, Salazar announced her candidacy to run in a rematch against Shalala. She was endorsed by President Donald Trump, won the August 2020 Republican primary, and faced Shalala in the November general election. The Cook Political Report, as well as various polling firms, classified the seat as "Likely Democratic", but Salazar won, 51.4% to 48.6%. She was one of 19 new Republican women elected to the House of Representatives in the 2020 elections. Politico reported that Shalala attributed Salazar's strength to the potency of the socialism attacks among Miami's Cuban population, aided by Shalala calling herself a "pragmatic socialist".

Tenure

In late 2020, Salazar was identified as a participant in the Freedom Force, a group of incoming Republican House members who "say they're fighting against socialism in America". Due to her COVID-19 quarantine, Salazar missed voting on certifying the presidential election results in the House on January 6, 2021. On January 12, the day she was sworn in to Congress, Salazar voted against removing Trump via the 25th Amendment. On January 13, she voted against Trump's second impeachment.

On February 4, 2021, Salazar was one of 11 Republicans who voted to strip Marjorie Taylor Greene of her House Education and Labor Committee and House Budget Committee assignments in response to controversial statements she had made about school shootings at Parkland and Sandy Hook, among other things. She released a statement on her vote, saying in part, "As I have repeatedly criticized Ilhan Omar for her anti-Semitic comments, I had to hold Marjorie Taylor Greene accountable for her denial of the Parkland Massacre, the Flight 77 crash, and accusing a Jewish family of starting the California wildfires. From now on, I will hold every Democrat to this new standard that they have created."

On May 19, 2021, Salazar joined 34 other Republicans and all Democrats in voting to approve the creation of the January 6 commission.

Committee assignments 
Salazar's committee assignments include:

 Committee on Foreign Affairs
 Subcommittee on the Middle East, North Africa and Global Counterterrorism
 Subcommittee on Western Hemisphere, Civilian Security, Migration and International Economic Policy
 Committee on Small Business
 Subcommittee on Contracting and Workforce (Ranking Member)
 Subcommittee on Innovation, Entrepreneurship, and Workforce Development
 Subcommittee on Underserved, Agricultural, and Rural Business Development

Caucus memberships 
 Republican Main Street Partnership
 Americans Abroad Caucus (co-chair)
 Republican Governance Group

Political positions

Abortion
Salazar opposes taxpayer funding for abortion.

Antitrust bill
In 2022, Salazar was one of 39 Republicans to vote for the Merger Filing Fee Modernization Act of 2022, an antitrust package that would crack down on corporations for anti-competitive behavior.

Citizenship
Salazar joined Senator Marco Rubio in suggesting that birthright citizenship should be "reviewed", citing abuse of the law by foreign visitors to South Florida. She has said she might be open to offering citizenship to some undocumented immigrants.

Donald Trump
Salazar said in 2018 that she wanted to do "whatever makes sense to the community"; of then-President Trump, she said, "The president has used pretty insensitive words. I will talk to him in a nice, respectful way, because I do respect the institution of the presidency."

Economy
In 2021, Salazar voted against the American Rescue Plan Act of 2021, a $1.9 trillion COVID-19 relief bill.

Environment
Salazar publicly supported a carbon tax proposal by then-Representative Carlos Curbelo, which many other Republicans rejected. One of Salazar's campaign commercials vowed to fight for environmental protection in Congress.

Gun policy
In March 2021, Salazar was one of eight Republicans to join the House majority in passing the Bipartisan Background Checks Act of 2021. She has called herself a "firm believer in the Second Amendment" while also saying that "ways must be found to keep guns out of the reach of those who should never have them, namely children, criminals and the mentally ill". She has endorsed criminal background checks and called for "effectively closing loopholes that allow criminals to have access to firearms." In October 2018, Salazar said she might also back an assault weapons ban. She voted against the Assault Weapons Ban of 2022.

In June 2022, Salazar voted to raise the legal age to buy some types of assault rifles from 18 to 21. She was one of 14 Republicans to vote in favor of the Bipartisan Safer Communities Act.

Healthcare
Salazar said that she would only support repeal of the Affordable Care Act if a viable alternative were presented. She opposed repeal of the ACA's mandate that health insurers cover preexisting conditions, but called for "free market" policies on health insurance.

Israel
Salazar is a supporter of Israel.

LGBTQ rights
On February 25, 2021, Salazar voted against the Equality Act, a bill that would prohibit discrimination based on gender identity and sexual orientation by amending the Civil Rights Act of 1964 and the Fair Housing Act to explicitly include new protections. Salazar said the bill "missed the mark by removing religious freedom protections."

In 2021, Salazar co-sponsored the Fairness for All Act, the Republican alternative to the Equality Act. The bill would prohibit discrimination on the basis of sex, sexual orientation, and gender identity, and protect the free exercise of religion.

In 2022, Salazar was one of six Republicans to vote for the Global Respect Act, which imposes sanctions on foreign persons responsible for violations of the internationally recognized human rights of lesbian, gay, bisexual, transgender, queer, and intersex (LGBTQI) people, and for other purposes.

On July 19, 2022, Salazar and 46 other Republican representatives voted for the Respect for Marriage Act, which would codify the right to same-sex marriage in federal law. On December 8, 2022, she voted against the final passage of the Respect for Marriage Act.

Socialism
Salazar criticized President Obama's policy of engagement with Cuba, saying that she would support lifting the U.S. trade embargo against Cuba only once there is democracy in Cuba. She said that democratic socialism means "misery, oppression and exile".

On January 13, 2023, Salazar reintroduced the FORCE Act, which "stops President Biden from normalizing relations with Cuba unless freedom and democracy are restored on the island".

Statehood for Puerto Rico
On March 2, 2021, Salazar and Resident Commissioner Jenniffer González introduced the Puerto Rico Statehood Admission Act.

Electoral history

2018

2020

Honors and awards
Salazar has won five Emmy Awards for reports on Nicaragua, Cuba, and the Dominican Republic. She was selected for the inaugural 2021 Forbes 50 Over 50, made up of entrepreneurs, leaders, scientists and creators who are over age 50.

Books
In 2010, Grijalbo, a branch name of Random House, published her book Si Dios contigo, ¿quién contra ti?.

Personal life
Salazar lives in Miami with her two daughters by her second husband, Renzo Maietto.

See also
Hispanic and Latino conservatism in the United States
List of Hispanic and Latino Americans in the United States Congress
Religious affiliation in the United States House of Representatives
Women in the United States House of Representatives

References

External links
Representative Maria Elvira Salazar official U.S. House website
 Campaign website
 
 CiberCuba Biographical Info
 

|-

 -->

1961 births
20th-century American journalists
21st-century American journalists
21st-century American politicians
21st-century American women politicians
American anti-communists
American Christians
American Protestants
American politicians of Cuban descent
American television journalists
American women in business
American women television journalists
Candidates in the 2018 United States elections
Christians from Florida
Female members of the United States House of Representatives
Hispanic and Latino American members of the United States Congress
Hispanic and Latino American people in television
Hispanic and Latino American women in politics
Harvard Kennedy School alumni
Living people
Miami Dade College alumni
News & Documentary Emmy Award winners
Opposition to Fidel Castro
People from Miami
Politicians from Miami
Protestants from Florida
Republican Party members of the United States House of Representatives from Florida
University of Miami School of Communication alumni
20th-century American women
Latino conservatism in the United States